Andris Šics (born 12 May 1985) is a Latvian luger. He competed in the 2006, 2010 and 2014 Winter Olympics, and won a silver medal in the men's doubles event in 2010 and two bronze medals in 2014, alongside his teammate and elder brother Juris Šics. The Šics brothers' three medals mean they have won more Olympic medals than any other Latvian sportsperson.

Šics won six medals at the FIL World Luge Championships with two silvers (Mixed team: 2016, 2020) and four bronzes (Men's doubles: 2011, Mixed team: 2008, 2009, 2013). He also won 15 medals at the FIL European Luge Championships with three golds in 2008, 2010 and 2021, four silvers in 2014, 2016, 2018 and 2021, and eight bronzes in 2006, 2015, 2017, 2018, 2019 and 2020. Šics' best individual European championship is winning the men's doubles event in 2021.

References

External links

List of European luge champions 

1985 births
Living people
Latvian male lugers
People from Sigulda
Lugers at the 2006 Winter Olympics
Lugers at the 2010 Winter Olympics
Lugers at the 2014 Winter Olympics
Lugers at the 2018 Winter Olympics
Lugers at the 2022 Winter Olympics
Olympic lugers of Latvia
Olympic silver medalists for Latvia
Olympic bronze medalists for Latvia
Olympic medalists in luge
Medalists at the 2010 Winter Olympics
Medalists at the 2014 Winter Olympics